Willem Cornelis Boeschoten (born 9 March 1953) is a retired Dutch rower who won a bronze medal in the coxless pairs at the 1975 World Rowing Championships, together with Jan van der Horst. They competed in this event at the 1976 Summer Olympics and finished in tenth place.

References

1953 births
Living people
Dutch male rowers
Olympic rowers of the Netherlands
Rowers at the 1976 Summer Olympics
Sportspeople from Hilversum
World Rowing Championships medalists for the Netherlands
20th-century Dutch people
21st-century Dutch people